Greece women's national handball team is the national team of Greece. It takes part in international team handball competitions. It is controlled by the Hellenic Handball Federation.

The team participated at the 2004 Summer Olympics, where they placed 10th.

References

External links
Official website
IHF profile

National team
Women's national handball teams
Handball